A senex amans (from Latin: "aged lover", "amorous old man") is a stock character of classical Greek and Roman  comedy, medieval literature (e.g., fabliau) and drama. It  is an old jealous man married to a young woman and thus often an object of mockery. He is variously ugly, impotent, puritanical, and foolish to be cuckolded by a young and handsome man. Often the term senex amans is applied to the very motif involving the three.

The classic example of a senex amans is Januarie (January) in the "Merchant's Tale" (part of the Canterbury Tales). He is 60 years old (which given the life expectancy was a very advanced age) and he marries a young girl (under 18) named May, who later cuckolds him by entering into a secret relationship with January's squire, Damyan (Damian).

The senex amans is not always a one-dimensional figure presented for derision. The morality within the tale itself is somewhat ambiguous, with the corrosive irony directed at January coupled with a more generalised sympathy and understanding.

See also
Forced marriage
Senex iratus

References

The Canterbury Tales
Marriage
Literary motifs
Works about old age
Male characters in theatre
Stock characters in ancient Greek comedy